The Blues is an album by American jazz saxophonist Johnny Hodges released on the Norgran label in October 1956. It features performances recorded in 1952, 1953 and 1954.

Reception

The AllMusic site awarded the album 3 stars out of 5.

Track listing
All compositions by Johnny Hodges, except as indicated
 "Rosanne" (Glenn Osser, Edna Osser, Dick Manning) - 3:06 	
 "Hodge-Podge" (Johnny Hodges, Duke Ellington) - 3:33
 "Jappa" - 3:49 	
 "Through for the Night" (Trummy Young) - 3:14	
 "The Sheik of Araby" (Ted Snyder, Harry B. Smith, Francis Wheeler) - 3:12
 "Latino" - 2:57 	
 "Johnny's Blues" (Edith Cue Hodges) - 7:00 	
 "Indiana" (Ballard MacDonald, James F. Hanley) - 3:48 	
 "Easy Going Bounce" (Leroy Lovett) - 3:30	
 "Burgundy Walk" - 7:05
Recorded in Los Angeles, CA on July 22, 1952 (tracks 1-3) in New York City on December 11, 1952 (tracks 4-6) and September 17, 1953 (tracks 7-9) and at Radio Recorders in Los Angeles, CA on July 2, 1954 (track 10)

Personnel
Johnny Hodges - alto saxophone
Emmett Berry, (tracks 1-9), Shorty Baker (track 10) - trumpet
Lawrence Brown - trombone
Arthur Clarke (tracks 7-9), John Coltrane (track 10), Ben Webster (tracks 1-6), Rudy Williams (tracks 4-6) - tenor saxophone
Ted Brannon (tracks 4-6), Call Cobbs (track 10), Leroy Lovett (tracks 1-3 & 7-9) - piano 
Ray Brown (tracks 7-9), Red Callender (tracks 1-3), Barney Richmond (tracks 4-6), John Williams (track 10) - bass
Louis Bellson (track 10), J. C. Heard (tracks 1-3 & 7-9), Al Walker (tracks 4-6) - drums

References

1956 albums
Johnny Hodges albums
Norgran Records albums
Albums produced by Norman Granz